"Redemption" is a single released by Japanese musician Gackt on January 25, 2006. It peaked at third place on the Oricon singles chart and charted for twelve weeks. In 2006, it was the 83rd best selling single with sales of 124,955 copies, making it to be Gackt's eighth best selling single. The "Longing" and "Redemption" were theme songs of the video game Dirge of Cerberus: Final Fantasy VII. It was certified gold by RIAJ.

Summary
In late 2005, Gackt was involved with the Final Fantasy VII franchise, for Square Enix's PlayStation 2 video game Dirge of Cerberus, released on January 26, 2006. Gackt composed and performed two theme songs for the game, "Longing" and "Redemption", and were released as a single, separately from the game's original soundtrack, but were included in its release a month later. For the game's ending theme, "Redemption", the staff originally planned for it to be a ballad, but Gackt decided to make it a rock song instead. Upon hearing Gackt's ideas, the staff were pleased with the direction in which he had gone. A limited edition of the single was published as well, containing a DVD with alternating music videos of the title track, one featuring the artist and the other being composed of footage from the video game Dirge of Cerberus. Gackt performed "Redemption" on the Diabolos: Aien no Shi tour in 2005, and played it extensively throughout his solo career. 

In addition to contributing music, the character Genesis Rhapsodos was modeled on, voiced and co-created by Gackt, and Gackt also acted as the character in a brief appearance during an optional ending of the game. Initially a character with very limited appearance, Genesis had an integral role in the 2007 video game Crisis Core.

Track listing

See also
 Music of the Final Fantasy VII series

References

2006 singles
Gackt songs
Final Fantasy music